Marathi Buddhists are Buddhists of Marathi ethnic and linguistic identity. The religious community resides in the Indian state of Maharashtra. They speak Marathi as their mother-tongue (first language). The Marathi Buddhist community is the largest Buddhist community in India. According to the 2011 Indian census, Marathi Buddhists constitute 5.81% of the population in Maharashtra, which is 77% of the total Buddhist population in India.

History

Almost all Marathi Buddhists belong to the Navayana tradition, a 20th-century Buddhist revival movement in India that received its most substantial impetus from B. R. Ambedkar who called for the conversion to Buddhism by rejecting the caste-based society of Hinduism, that considered them to be the lowest in the hierarchy.

B. R. Ambedkar publicly converted on 14 October 1956, at Deekshabhoomi, Nagpur, over 20 years after he declared his intent to convert. He converted approximately 600,000 people to Buddhism. The conversion ceremony was attended by Medharathi, his main disciple Bhoj Dev Mudit, and Mahastvir Bodhanand's Sri Lankan successor, Bhante Pragyanand. Ambedkar asked Dalits not to get entangled in the existing branches of Buddhism (Theravada, Mahayana and Vajrayana), and called his version Navayana or 'Neo-Buddhism'. Ambedkar would die less than two months later, just after finishing his definitive work on Buddhism. Many Buddhists employ the term "Ambedkarite Buddhism" to designate the Buddhist movement, which started with Ambedkar's conversion. Converted people call themselves "Bauddha" i.e. Buddhists.

Population

Almost all Marathi Buddhists are converts from Hinduism. Most Buddhist Marathi people belong to the former Mahar community who adopted Buddhism with Ambedkar in 1956.

In the 1951 census of India, In Maharashtra, 2,487 (0.01%) respondents said they were Buddhist. The 1961 census, taken after B. R. Ambedkar adopted Navayana Buddhism with his millions of followers in 1956, showed an increase to 2,789,501 (7.05%).

Marathi Buddhists account for 77.36% of all Buddhists in India. According to the 2011 Census of India there are 6.5 million Buddhists in Maharashtra but Buddhist leaders claim there are about 10 to 12 million Buddhists in Maharashtra. Among cities Mumbai has largest Buddhist population accounting for 4.85% of total Mumbai population. Almost 90 per cent of Navayana Buddhists live in the state. 5,204,284 (79.68%) Marathi Buddhists belong to the Scheduled Caste category.

Notable Marathi Buddhists

Culture

Festivals
 Buddha Purnima, public holiday in Maharashtra
 Babasaheb Ambedkar Jayanti, public holiday in Maharashtra
 Dhammachakra Pravartan Day, public holiday in Maharashtra
 Ashadha Puja
 Deepdan Divas : Occurs on same day of Hindu festival Deepavali, celebrated on the commemoration of Lord Buddha's return to Kapilavastu.
 Magha Puja

See also
 Buddhist Society of India
 Dalit Buddhist movement
 Lord Buddha TV
 Marathi people
 Religion in Maharashtra
 Buddhism in Mizoram(State)

References

External links
 Indian Buddhist Data from the 1951 census to the 2011 census

Buddhism in Maharashtra
Buddhist communities of India
Demographics of India
Navayana Buddhists
Social groups of Maharashtra